The 2022–23 season is the 103rd season in the existence of Leeds United and the club's third consecutive season in the Premier League. In general, it is their 53rd ever season in the top flight of English football. In addition to the league, they also competed in the FA Cup and the EFL Cup.

Review

August

Leeds began their Premier League campaign against Wolverhampton Wanderers at Elland Road on 6 August, winning by a score of 2–1. Daniel Podence opened the scoring for Wolves in the 6th minute. Before the half-time interval, Rodrigo levelled the scores. Leeds went ahead in the 74th minute after Rayan Aït-Nouri turned Patrick Bamford's cross, intended for Brenden Aaronson, into his own goal.

Leeds' following match was against Southampton at St Mary's Stadium on 13 August, Leeds drew 2–2 with Rodrigo opening the scoring right after the half–time interval, scoring at the near post from a cross. Rodrigo doubled Leeds' advantage on the 60th minute heading in at the back post from a corner. Southampton scored in the 72nd minute after Adam Armstrong's pass found Joe Aribo, who took the ball around Leeds goalkeeper Illan Meslier to score. Southampton equalised in the 81st minute after Sékou Mara found Kyle Walker-Peters who scored from a tight angle.

Leeds next hosted rivals Chelsea at Elland Road on 21 August, winning 3–0. Brenden Aaronson gave Leeds the lead when he pressured Chelsea goalkeeper Édouard Mendy into giving away the ball for Aaronson to tap in on the 33rd minute, scoring his first goal for the club. Rodrigo added Leeds' second minutes later heading in from a Jack Harrison cross. Harrison added Leeds' third on the 69th minute to complete their first win over Chelsea in nearly twenty years. Kalidou Koulibaly was shown a second yellow card and subsequently sent off for Chelsea, for bringing down Joe Gelhardt in the 84th minute. The result moved Leeds up to 3rd in the Premier League table.

Leeds' following match was against League One club Barnsley at Elland Road in the EFL Cup second round on 24 August. Leeds won the tie 3–1, with goals coming from Luis Sinisterra, and two from Mateusz Klich.

The next two matches saw Leeds lose 1–0 to Brighton & Hove Albion at the AMEX Stadium on 27 August, Pascal Groß opened the scoring with the only goal of the match in the 66th minute following an assist by Leandro Trossard in their first defeat of the season; and a 1–1 draw at home at Elland Road against Everton on 30 August, Anthony Gordon opened the scoring in the 17th minute following a through ball by Alex Iwobi. Leeds equalised through Luis Sinisterra, scoring his first Premier League goal for the club after Brenden Aaronson found him on the edge of the box.

September

Leeds began September by travelling to the Gtech Community Stadium to play Brentford on 3 September, losing by a score of 5–2. Ivan Toney opened the scoring for Brentford in the 30th minute with a penalty kick after foul on him by Luis Sinisterra, Toney then doubled Brentford's lead three minutes before the half-time interval with a free-kick. Sinisterra then pulled a goal back for Leeds in first-half stoppage time following a throw-in by Pascal Struijk. Toney then wrapped up his hat-trick after Leeds goalkeeper Illan Meslier came out of the Leeds penalty area following a long-range shot by Mathias Jensen in the 58th minute. Referee Robert Jones then sent-off Leeds head coach Jesse Marsch for appealing for a penalty following a foul on Crysencio Summerville by Aaron Hickey in the 64th minute. Marc Roca then scored a second goal for Leeds with his first goal for the club following a low-cross by Luke Ayling in the 79th minute. Bryan Mbeumo then scored a fourth for Brentford following a header on by Toney in the 80th minute, Yoane Wissa then added a fifth goal for Brentford after he stole the ball from Diego Llorente in second-half stoppage time.

Their following two matches against Nottingham Forest at Elland Road scheduled for 12 September and against rivals Manchester United at Old Trafford scheduled for 18 September were postponed due to the death of Queen Elizabeth II on 8 September.

October

Leeds began October by hosting Aston Villa at Elland Road on 2 October, drawing 0–0. Luis Sinisterra was shown a second yellow card and subsequently sent off for Leeds, following a foul on Jacob Ramsey in the 48th minute.

Their next two matches saw Leeds play two clubs from London, firstly, they lost 2–1 to Crystal Palace at Selhurst Park on 9 October, Pascal Struijk opened the scoring for Leeds in the 10th minute following a shot by Brenden Aaronson. Odsonne Édouard then equalised for Crystal Palace in the 24th minute following a free-kick by Michael Olise. Eberechi Eze then scored the winner for Crystal Palace in the 76th minute following a pass by Wilfried Zaha; and they then lost again this time 1–0 against league-leaders Arsenal at Elland Road on 16 October, Bukayo Saka opened the scoring for Arsenal with the only goal of the match in the 35th minute following a pass by Martin Ødegaard.

Leeds then travelled travelled to the King Power Stadium to play Leicester City on 20 October, losing 2–0. Robin Koch opened the scoring for Leicester in the 16th minute with an own goal following a low-cross by Dennis Praet, Harvey Barnes then scored a second for Leicester in the 35th minute following a pass by Kiernan Dewsbury-Hall.

Leeds then hosted Fulham at Elland Road on 23 October, losing 3–2. Rodrigo opened the scoring for Leeds in the 20th minute following a shot by Jack Harrison, Aleksandar Mitrović the equalised for Fulham in the 26th minute following a corner by Andreas Pereira, Bobby Decordova-Reid then put Fulham ahead in the 74th minute following a cross by Pereira, Willian then scored a third for Fulham in the 84th minute following a pass by Harrison Reed, Crysencio Summerville scored a second for Leeds in second-half stoppage time following a pass by Joe Gelhardt.

Leeds then travelled to Anfield to play Liverpool on 29 October, winning 2–1. Rodrigo opened the scoring for Leeds in the 4th minute after Brenden Aaronson forced Joe Gomez into a back-pass to Alisson Becker which he missed giving Rodrigo a tap-in, Mohamed Salah then equalised for Liverpool in the 14th minute following a cross by Andrew Robertson, Crysencio Summerville scored the winner for Leeds in second-half stoppage time after Patrick Bamford brought down a cross by Wilfried Gnonto.

November

Leeds began November by hosting Bournemouth at Elland Road on 5 November, winning 4–3. Rodrigo opened the scoring for Leeds in the 3rd minute with a penalty following a foul on Crysencio Summerville by Marcos Senesi, Marcus Tavernier then equalised for Bournemouth in the 7th minute following a cross by Ryan Fredericks and then Philip Billing put Bournemouth ahead following a shot by Tavernier that was saved by Leeds goalkeeper Illan Meslier in the 19th minute, Dominic Solanke then scored a third for Bournemouth in the 48th minute following a low-cross by Tavernier. Sam Greenwood then pulled a goal back for Leeds in the 60th minute with long-range shot following a cross by Pascal Struijk, Liam Cooper then equalised for Leeds in the 68th minute following a corner by Greenwood, Summerville scored the winner for Leeds in the 84th minute following a pass by Wilfried Gnonto.

Leeds travelled to Molineux to play Wolverhampton Wanderers in the EFL Cup third round on 9 November, losing 1–0. Boubacar Traoré opened the scoring for Wolves with the only goal of the match in 85th minute.

Leeds then travelled to the Tottenham Hotspur Stadium to play Tottenham Hotspur on 12 November, losing 4–3. Crysencio Summerville opened the scoring for Leeds in the 10th minute following a pass by Brenden Aaronson, Harry Kane then equalised for Spurs in the 25th minute, Rodrigo then put Leeds ahead three minutes before half-time following a header towards him by Rasmus Kristensen, Ben Davies equalised for Spurs in the 51st minute, Rodrigo then put Leeds ahead again in the 76th minute, Rodrigo Bentancur then equalised for Spurs again in the 81st minute following a cross by Matt Doherty and Bentancur then scored winner for Spurs in the 83rd minute following a pass by Dejan Kulusevski. Tyler Adams was then sent off for Leeds in the 87th minute following a foul on Yves Bissouma.

December

Leeds began December by hosting Manchester City at Elland Road on 28 December, losing 3–1. Rodri opened the scoring for Manchester City in first-half stoppage time following a shot by Riyad Mahrez which was saved by Leeds goalkeeper Illan Meslier, Erling Haaland then scored a second for Manchester City in the 51st minute following a pass across goal by Jack Grealish, Haaland then scored a third for Manchester City in the 64th minute following another pass by Grealish. Pascal Struijk then scored a consolation goal for Leeds in the 73rd minute following a corner by Sam Greenwood.

Leeds then travelled to St James' Park to play Newcastle United on 31 December, drawing 0–0.

January

Leeds began January by hosting West Ham United at Elland Road on 4 January, drawing 2–2. Wilfried Gnonto opened the scoring for Leeds with first goal for the club in the 27th minute following a pass by Crysencio Summerville, Lucas Paquetá then equalised for West Ham in first-half stoppage time with a penalty kick awarded following a foul on Jarrod Bowen by Pascal Struijk. Gianluca Scamacca then put West Ham ahead in the 46th minute after Brenden Aaronson gave the ball to him and Rodrigo then equalised for Leeds in the 70th minute following a pass by Jack Harrison.

Leeds then travelled to the Cardiff City Stadium to play Championship club Cardiff City in the FA Cup third round on 8 January, drawing 2–2. Jaden Philogene opened the scoring for Cardiff in the 24th minute, then Sheyi Ojo scored a second for Cardiff in the 31st minute, Rodrigo pulled a goal back for Leeds in the 65th minute, Sonny Perkins then equalised for Leeds with his first goal for the club in second-half stoppage time to send the match to a replay at Elland Road. Leeds would go on to win the replay 5-2 on 18 January. Wilfried Gnonto opened the scoring just 26 seconds in, before Rodrigo made it 2–0. Gnonto then scored his second of the night, Patrick Bamford scored twice after coming on as a substitute. Callum Robinson scored two consolations for Cardiff, one of which was a penalty kick awarded for a handball by Marc Roca, but Leeds progressed to the fourth round for the first time since the 2016–17 season under the management of Garry Monk.

Before their FA Cup replay with Cardiff City, Leeds travelled to Villa Park to play Aston Villa on 13 January, losing 2-1 with Leon Bailey opening the scoring for Villa in the 3rd minute following a pass from Boubacar Kamara, Emiliano Buendía then added a second for Villa in the 64th minute following a shot by Bailey which was saved by Leeds goalkeeper Illan Meslier which was checked for an offside by the Video assistant referee (VAR) eventually given as onside. Patrick Bamford did score a consolation goal for Leeds in the 83rd minute following a pass by Joe Gelhardt. This result put pressure on Leeds head coach Jesse Marsch as Leeds hadn't won in the league since against Bournemouth in November 2022.

Leeds then hosted Brentford at Elland Road on 22 January, drawing 0–0. 

Leeds ended January by travelling to the Wham Stadium to play League One club Accrington Stanley in the FA Cup fourth round on 28 January, winning 3–1. Jack Harrison opened the scoring for Leeds in the 23rd minute, scoring from outside the box. Junior Firpo added Leeds' second in the 66th minute following a pass from Patrick Bamford with his first goal for the club, minutes later Luis Sinisterra added Leeds' third. Leslie Adekoya scored a consultation for Accrington, but Leeds progressed to the fifth round for the first time since the 2015–16 season under the management of Steve Evans.

February 
Leeds began February by travelling to the City Ground to play Nottingham Forest on 5 February, losing 1–0. Brennan Johnson scored the only goal of the match in the 14th minute following a free-kick by Morgan Gibbs-White.

On 6 February, it was announced that Leeds had sacked head coach Jesse Marsch following their 1–0 defeat to Nottingham Forest. He leaves with Leeds in 17th place in the Premier League, and only outside the relegation zone on goal difference.

Two days later, Leeds began to play back-to-back league matches in the space of four days against their Roses rivals, Manchester United. Michael Skubala took charge of Leeds' trip to Old Trafford on 8 February, drawing 2–2. Wilfried Gnonto put Leeds infront inside the first minute following a pass from Patrick Bamford. Raphaël Varane doubled Leeds' advantage in the 48th minute turning the ball into his own net, following a cross from Crysencio Summerville. Marcus Rashford's 62nd minute header made it 2–1, following a cross from Diogo Dalot. Jadon Sancho equalised for Manchester United in the 70th minute. On 12 February, the two sides met again this time at Elland Road, with Manchester United winning 2–0 following late goals from Marcus Rashford and Alejandro Garnacho.

On 18 February, Leeds travelled to Goodison Park to play Everton, losing 1–0. Séamus Coleman scored the only goal of the game in the 64th minute following a pass from Alex Iwobi.

On 21 February, it was announced that Leeds had appointed former Watford boss Javi Gracia as manager subject to a work permit. On 25 February, Leeds hosted Southampton at Elland Road , winning 1–0. Junior Firpo scored the only goal of the game in the 77th minute, following a pass from Jack Harrison.

Leeds ended February by travelling to Craven Cottage to play Fulham in the FA Cup fifth round on 28 February, losing 2–0. João Palhinha and Manor Solomon the goalscorers.

March 

Leeds began March by travelling to Stamford Bridge to play Chelsea, losing 1-0. Wesley Fofana scored the only goal of the game from a corner.

Transfers

In

Out

Loans in

Loans out

Pre-season and friendlies
Leeds announced they would travel to Australia during their pre-season preparations, with matches against Brisbane Roar, Aston Villa and Crystal Palace. On 28 June, two further friendlies were added to the schedule, against Blackpool and Cagliari.

During the mid-season winter break, Leeds announced that they would play a friendly against Elche at the Estadio Manuel Martinez Valero. Two further friendlies at Elland Road against Real Sociedad and Monaco were also added.

Competitions

Overall record

Premier League

League table

Results summary

Results by round

Matches

On 16 June, the Premier League fixtures were released.

FA Cup

Leeds travelled to the Cardiff City Stadium to play Championship club Cardiff City in the third round on 8 January 2023, drawing 2–2. Jaden Philogene opened the scoring for Cardiff in the 24th minute, Sheyi Ojo scored a second for Cardiff in the 31st minute, Rodrigo pulled a goal back for Leeds in the 65th minute, Sonny Perkins equalised for Leeds with his first goal for the club in second-half stoppage time to send the match to a replay at Elland Road. Leeds would go on to win the replay 5–2 on 18 January. Wilfried Gnonto opened the scoring just 26 seconds in, before Rodrigo made it 2–0. Gnonto then scored his second of the night, Patrick Bamford scored twice after coming on as a substitute. Callum Robinson scored two consolations for Cardiff, one of which was a penalty kick awarded for a handball by Marc Roca, but Leeds progressed to the fourth round for the first time since the 2016–17 season under the management of Garry Monk.

Leeds travelled to The Wham Stadium to play EFL League One club Accrington Stanley in the FA Cup fourth round on 28 January, winning 3–1. Jack Harrison opened the scoring for Leeds in the 23rd minute, scoring from outside the box. Junior Firpo added Leeds' second in the 66th minute following a pass from Patrick Bamford with his first goal for the club, minutes later Luis Sinisterra added Leeds' third. Leslie Adekoya scored a consultation for Accrington, but Leeds progressed to the fifth round for the first time since the 2015–16 season under the management of Steve Evans.

Leeds travelled to Craven Cottage to play Fulham in the FA Cup fifth round on 28 February, losing 2–0. João Palhinha and Manor Solomon the goalscorers.

EFL Cup

Leeds entered the competition in the second round and were given a home tie against Barnsley with Leeds winning the match 3–1 with Luis Sinisterra opening the scoring for Leeds, then Mateusz Klich doubled their lead from the penalty spot before Mads Andersen pulled a goal back for Barnsley and then Klich made sure that Leeds were in the draw for the third round. In the third round Leeds were drawn away at Molineux, against Wolverhampton Wanderers and they lost the match 1–0 with a goal from Boubacar Traoré.

Player statistics

Appearances and goals

The plus (+) symbol denotes an appearance as a substitute, hence 2+1 indicates two appearances in the starting XI and one appearance as a substitute.

Players with zero appearances were unused substitutes named in at least one matchday squad.

Disciplinary record
Includes all competitive matches. The list is sorted by squad number when total cards / disciplinary points are equal. Players with no cards not included in the list.

See also
 2022–23 in English football
 List of Leeds United F.C. seasons

References

Leeds United
Leeds United F.C. seasons